Guatemala–Russia relations is the bilateral relationship between Guatemala and Russia.

History
Guatemala had diplomatic relations with the Soviet Union on April 19, 1945, during the Cold War era. However, during the armed conflict in Guatemala in 1960–1980, Guatemalan-Soviet relations were "frozen", but were not severed or interrupted. On January 4, 1991, a joint communique about the exchange of the diplomatic missions was signed. In 1995, the first Guatemalan embassy was opened in Moscow, while Russia was represented in Guatemala through its embassy in Costa Rica. Nevertheless, in 2007, Russia had opened an embassy in Guatemala City.

The Russian Federation together with other states and with international organizations supported the process of peaceful settlement in Guatemala.

See also
Foreign relations of Guatemala
Foreign relations of Russia

External links
Embassy of Russia in Guatemala City

Russia
Bilateral relations of Russia